Rakesh Pandey (born 27 August 1968) is an Indian writer and editor of an international Hindi magazine named "Pravasi Sansar". He was born in Kasara, a village in Amethi, Uttar Pradesh on 27 August 1968. He has earned his Doctorate (PhD) in Analytical Study of Awadhi Folk Natya and Hindi Natya Kala. He has been a part of several World Hindi Conferences. He had interviewed the then Foreign minister Smt. Sushma Swaraj during the Vishwa Hindi Sammelan which was held in Bhopal.

He is doing remarkable work for Hindi and Awadhi. Under the banner of "Hindi Bacho Munch" he has put a lot of work and effort to include the other dialects of the Hindi Language in the Schedule 8 of the Indian Constitution. He was awarded the Sahitya Creation Award by the UP Hindi Sansthan. His magazine "Pravasi Sansar" completed 10 years of publication in 2016 and the celebratory occasion was graced by Mrs Mridula Sinha (then Governor of Goa) & Sh. Virendra Sharma (Member of Parliament, United Kingdom) at the House of Commons, London.

Literary works

Publications 
 Gandhi and Hindi (Published by National Book Trust, Government of India)
 Gandhi in Literature Banned by the British Government (Joint publication of National Archives, Government of India and Diamond Books)
 Gandhi and Girmitiya (Vani Publications)
Mauritius: Unique pilgrimage of Indian culture
 Contribution of Hindi and vernacular languages.
 Eighth Schedule and Hindi.
 Words of sunshine, poetry collection.
 Guide to Indian Premier League: Everyting You Wanted to Know About IPL (Paperback)

Awards 
 Rotary Hindi Seva Samman 2009 by Rotary Club Delhi 
 Avadh Jyoti Silver Award
 Deshantar Bhasha Seva Award 2008 by Dushyantkumar Manuscript Museum Bhopal
 World Hindi Samiti New York America for Hindi service awarded in America 
 Vishisht Hindi Seva Medal by National Hindi Council 
 Literary Journalism Award by Pt. Ramprasad Bismil Foundation 
 Social Cultural and National Human Service Award 2007 by the literary institution Uddhav
 Yugin Samman 2006 
 Honor for Hindi service by Swaha, the main organization of Hindi of Trinidad and Tobago

References 

1968 births
Living people
Indian writers
Indian magazine founders
Indian magazine editors
People from Amethi
People from Uttar Pradesh